Caballito means "little horse" in Spanish, from caballo = "horse" + -ito, diminutive suffix. It may refer to:  
Caballito, Buenos Aires   
Caballito, a 1910 Mexican peso coin   
Caballito, a rhythm found in merengue music   
Caballito, a Panamanian gin   
Caballito, a Mexican type of narrow shot glass   
Caballito de Tolsá, an equestrian statue of Charles IV   
Caballito Island in Kindred comics   
Caballito, 2012 novel by Dr Robin Baker